The Rubens vase is a Late Antique or early Byzantine hardstone carving of a single piece of agate in the form of a vase, named after a later owner, Peter Paul Rubens, (from 1619 to 1626), who in Flanders made a pen drawing of it, which is now held in the Hermitage Museum. The handles are decorated with the head of Pan on each side with acanthus leaves beneath each head, curled up. It is believed to have been commissioned by a Byzantine emperor, perhaps around 400 AD, and made in Constantinople. That it appeared in Europe (France specifically) after the Sack of Constantinople by the Fourth Crusade, may indicate that it was the result of plunder. After passing through the collections of the Dukes of Anjou, Charles V, Peter Paul Rubens, and the Mughal Emperor Jahangir, it was eventually purchased by Henry Walters.

Here is the provenance:

References 

Byzantine art
Works looted by the Fourth Crusade
Individual hardstone carvings
Individual vases